Capital London is a radio station owned and operated by the Global media company as part of its national Capital FM Network.  As Capital Radio it was launched in the London area in 1973 as one of Britain's first two commercial radio stations. Its brief was to entertain, while its opposite number, London Broadcasting (LBC), was licensed to provide news and information. In search of a larger audience in 1974, Capital Radio rapidly moved from a general and entertainment station with drama, features, documentaries and light music to a more successful pop music-based format.

In 1988 it became two stations: 95.8 Capital FM and Capital Gold. After some national expansion with the purchase of other radio stations the Capital Radio Group merged with GWR Group in 2005 to form GCap Media which in turn was taken over by Global Radio in 2008. In 2011 Capital was launched nationally, apart from the daily breakfast and weekday drivetime shows, becoming part of the Capital FM Network. In 2019 the breakfast show also became national, with 11 regional drivetime shows.

History

Pre-launch 
The Sound Broadcasting Act 1972 allowed for the establishment of local commercial radio stations in the United Kingdom to operate alongside the national radio stations provided by the BBC.

In October 1972 the Independent Broadcasting Authority invited applications for two local radio licences in London: one for a general and entertainment station, the other for news and information.

The licence for the entertainment service saw eight organisations applying, many of them with established entertainment pedigrees. Associated Television, run by Lew Grade, was one of them, as was the long-established Isle of Man broadcaster Manx Radio. Others were specially formed companies: Piccadilly Radio under the leadership of the film producer Lord Brabourne, Network Broadcasting headed by the writer Lord Willis and the broadcaster Ned Sherrin, the actor and comedian Bernard Braden’s London Radio Independent Broadcasters and London Independent Broadcasting which included the impresario Robert Stigwood, the then radio producer John Whitney, the record and electronics company EMI, and Mecca Leisure Group. The theatre director Peter Hall (director) supported Artists in Radio.

The successful franchisee, however, was Capital Radio Limited. This company, with shareholders including Rediffusion Radio Holdings Limited, Local News of London Limited and The Observer (Holdings) Limited was headed as chairman by the actor and film director Richard Attenborough. Other board members at that time included record producer George Martin, actor and film director Bryan Forbes, theatrical producer Peter Saunders, and a millionaire dentist and long-time commercial radio enthusiast Barclay Barclay-White. By the time of Capital Radio’s launch in October 1973 some of the competitors for the licence such as Lord Willis and John Whitney had joined the board.

Test transmissions by the IBA commenced in January 1973 using the VHF frequency 95.8 MHz for FM from the Croydon transmitter and the MW frequency 557 kHz (539 m) for AM from London Transport's Lots Road Power Station, Chelsea. The location of the medium-wave transmitter and the frequency used were only temporary until a new high-powered medium-wave station at Saffron Green, Barnet, was completed.

In the meantime Capital Radio set about obtaining premises from which to broadcast and employing staff and on-air personnel, setting up temporary headquarters at 96 Piccadilly in London's Mayfair. Michael Bukht was appointed programme controller, Aidan Day Head of Music and Ron Onions Head of News, while Gerry O'Reilly was appointed Chief Engineer.

Launch

On 16 October 1973 Capital commenced regular transmissions with the British national anthem "God Save the Queen", then a message from director Richard Attenborough "...This, for the very first time, is Capital Radio" followed by the Capital Radio theme jingle, made by Blue Mink:

"Isn't it good to know,
Capital Radio
You can turn on the friend, you can turn on the show,
you can turn on the world with Capital Radio
Such a good way to make your day
Capital sounds go round and round,
London town, up and down.
The brightest sound in London town
Capital Radio in tune with London (yeah)"... 
Simon & Garfunkel's song "Bridge over Troubled Water" followed the jingle. The first radio commercial came from Birds Eye fish fingers, which was also the first ever legal radio commercial on LBC.

Capital started in the, literally, dark days of the three-day week when electricity was rationed because of a miners' strike. In the days before its launch, staff worked in the gloom to get the station ready to go on air.

Capital's programming remit, as with all ILR stations at the time, was to appeal to the broadest range of people as possible, which included specialist music programmes, radio plays, classical music, community features and news documentaries. The host of Capital's first show was former BBC Light Programme and former BBC Radio 1 presenter David Symonds,. After Symonds moved to the Capital Countdown show, he was replaced at breakfast by the former Radio London partnership of Kenny Everett and Dave Cash (known for The Kenny & Cash Show).

Immediately after going on air, Capital Radio suffered co-channel interference from Radio Veronica, a pirate radio station off the coast of the Netherlands. Veronica began broadcasting in the 1960s and it was suggested that the allocation of 539 metres to ILR may have been an attempt to block reception of overseas broadcasts – a battle which preceded the launch of BBC Radio 1. Capital finally moved into office blocks in Euston Tower in September 1973, just a few yards away from Thames Television headquarters. Euston Tower was, at the time, London's tallest office tower.

In 1975, the IBA opened the transmission facilities at Saffron Green which allowed both LBC and Capital Radio to move up the dial. Capital moved to 1548 kHz mediumwave (194 m) and LBC to 1152 kHz (261 m). Saffron Green needed to be highly configured as it was sharing the same frequency as other ILR stations and needed to prevent co-channel interference from new ILR stations in Birmingham and Manchester. Previously the aerial wire suspended between the towers of Lots Road site gained Capital and LBC the semi-humorous nickname of "Radio Clothesline" however both stations could be heard as far away as the Midlands. FM reception remained unaltered.

Capital in danger (1974–5)
Capital continued broadcasting, eventually increasing its hours. The so-called 'needle-time' restrictions on playing recorded music had been lifted, which meant it could play more of it during the day as well as in the evenings where the eight hours were concentrated.

Charities and the Flying Eye 

The mid-1970s saw Capital Radio expand with the launch of the Help a London Child charity, which aimed to raise money for London's poorest children. The charity appeal went on to become one of the longest-running in broadcasting and the most recognised in British radio. In recognition of this, Network Southeast named British Rail Class 47 47710 "Capital Radio's Help a London Child", in August 1991. In 1976, Capital Radio, Thames Television, London Weekend Television and British Telecom launched the Capital Radio Helpline which helped listeners through matters ranging from how to cook a turkey at Christmas time to suicide intervention. The station has also lent its support to London-based orchestras, choral societies, the British Film Institute Children's Film Festival and many other ventures.

1976 saw the launch of the Flying Eye, a traffic-spotting light aircraft, which could see traffic congestion below on the streets of Central London. LBC also had a similar service but was forced to suspend operations due to cost. Capital's aircraft was originally a Piper Seneca model, and, later, a twin-engined Grumman Cougar.

Music Power (1980s) 

A new radio jingle package from Standard Sound heralded a new, refined sound for the station. Output was concentrated on its core playlist of contemporary chart music with the specialist music rescheduled to evenings. Jazz and soul programmes at the weekends were well received by listeners. Charlie Gillett had his world music programme The World of Difference on Sunday evenings. Several of Capital's early presenters had moved on, to be replaced by newer disc jockeys, some of whom had experience presenting on Radio Luxembourg. Although it would only broadcast for three years, the Mike Allen hip hop show was influential during this time to bring the new music culture to the UK.

A brand new breakfast show hosted by Chris Tarrant launched in March 1987. Tarrant initially arrived at Capital presenting a Sunday lunchtime show before being promoted to a weekday lunchtime slot. Joined by Kara Noble, the partnership proved very popular and the Breakfast Show eventually became one of the most listened to radio programmes on British radio. Many industry commentators consider the station's output in the 1980s represented Capital Radio at its broadcasting peak.

One becomes two: the frequency split (1989–96)

In 1987, as required by the Broadcasting Act 1990, all ILR stations were to permanently split simulcasting output on both its AM and FM frequencies in order to create new local radio stations and improve choice. Capital responded the following year by launching a golden oldies station called Capital Gold, initially at the weekend prior to going full time on 1 November, on its AM frequency while Capital on FM became 95.8 Capital FM, a chart contemporary music station. Both stations received brand-new jingle packages from Californian jingle house Who Did That Music (later Groove Addicts, now Grooveworx.) that went on to become well known and essential parts of its music programming.

1997–2010
From 1997, the studios of 95.8 Capital FM have been based in Leicester Square, which is also home to Capital's parent company, Global. The studio complex is shared with many other stations, including Heart, Smooth Radio, Classic FM, Capital XTRA, Radio X, LBC and Gold.

The station launched its website in September 1996 resulting in high demand which led to it crashing within a few hours.

Beginning in late 2005, the station went through a number of changes. In December 2005, Chris Brooks moved from weekend breakfast to host 1–4 in the afternoon and Richard Bacon presenting The Go Home Show between 4–7. A new policy started of two advertisements in each break to win favour with listeners, though there were more frequent breaks as a result. This policy was changed within a few months.

On 9 January 2006, the station was relaunched under its original name Capital Radio, with a modified line-up of presenters and a slightly tweaked music format. After this re-launch turned out not to have had the desired success, a new Programme Controller was appointed that September. Scott Muller came from the Nova group in Australia, and the station saw another tweak in style.

The changes continued seeing Capital re-branded back to "London's Hit Music Station", a play on the station's earlier brand of "London's Number One Hit Music Station" with noticeable improvements – leading to a rise in audience figures at the end of 2006. The station also changed its on-air name to 95.8 Capital Radio, incorporating the frequency of "95.8" back into the station since it was dropped at the January 2006 re-launch.

In March 2007, the station was then renamed Capital 95.8 and its slogan became "The Sound of London". The marketing campaign combined outdoor, cinema, and print adverts.

RAJAR figures for Q2 2007 showed Capital 95.8 slipping to fourth place in the London local radio market ratings, recording the lowest-ever share of the London audience and for the first time falling behind Emap-owned station Magic and Heart, now owned by Global. Capital 95.8's audience share slipped from 4.6 to 4.1 per cent over the quarter.

The station then returned to the "London's Hit Music Network" tagline on 10 December 2007, with ex-Absolute Radio presenter Greg Burns replacing Lucio on drivetime, and Lucio moving to the evening show. Lucio took over from Bam Bam (Peter Poulton) who left Capital in early December 2007. On 6 June 2008, Global completed its £375 million takeover of Capital's owner GCap Media.

2011–present
Capital London formed part of the then nine-station Capital network on 3 January 2011 as part of a merger of the Global owned Hit Music and Galaxy networks. Weekday breakfast and drivetime plus weekend mornings were localised with other output simulcast with the rest of the network.

Capital London localised presenters are responsible for playing music which is syndicated across the nine station Capital radio network, during Capital Breakfast, weekday drivetime and weekend mornings.

On 12 May 2011 it was announced that 95.8 Capital remained the most-listened-to commercial radio station in London, on both share and reach, beating rival Magic 105.4. However, on 4 August that year it was announced that rival Magic 105.4 had overtaken the position.

As of April 2019 only weekday drivetime is exclusive to Capital London.

Current presenters

Weekdays  
 Kemi Rodgers
Lauren Layfield
Roman Kemp
Sian Welby
Chris Stark
 Rio Fredrika
 Aimee Vivian 
 Will Manning
Jimmy Hill
Sonny Jay
MistaJam
 Meg McHugh

Weekends
 Chris Ros 
 Niall Gray
 Jay London
 Kamilla Rose
 Charlie Powell  
 Ant Payne

Capital Music Awards 
The radio has hosted the Capital Awards, also known as Capital Music Awards.

See also
Capital (radio network)
Timeline of Capital Radio
Capital Breakfast (London)
Capital Radio One
List of radio stations in the United Kingdom
Scorpio Sound

References

External links

Capital London at CapitalFM.com/London 
Make Some Noise at CapitalFM.com/Charity

Radio stations established in 1973
London
Radio stations in London
Contemporary hit radio stations in the United Kingdom

pt:Capital London